Dino Sinovčić (born 16 June 1992) is a Croatian Paralympic swimmer who competes in international elite events. He is a World and European champion in backstroke swimming.

References

1992 births
Living people
Sportspeople from Split, Croatia
Paralympic swimmers of Croatia
Medalists at the World Para Swimming Championships
Medalists at the World Para Swimming European Championships
Swimmers at the 2016 Summer Paralympics
Swimmers at the 2020 Summer Paralympics
Medalists at the 2020 Summer Paralympics
Paralympic medalists in swimming
Paralympic bronze medalists for Croatia
S6-classified Paralympic swimmers